Tonny Mupariwa (born 10 September 1991) is a Zimbabwean first-class cricketer who plays for Matabeleland Tuskers.

References

External links
 

1991 births
Living people
Zimbabwean cricketers
Matabeleland Tuskers cricketers
Sportspeople from Bulawayo